The 2020–21 season was Mezőkövesdi SE's 6th competitive season, 5th consecutive season in the OTP Bank Liga and 43rd year in existence as a football club.

Transfers

Summer

In:

Out:

Source:

Winter

In:

Out:

Nemzeti Bajnokság I

League table

Results summary

Results by round

Matches

Hungarian Cup

Statistics

Appearances and goals
Last updated on 10 May 2021.

|-
|colspan="14"|Youth players:

|-
|colspan="14"|Out to loan:

|-
|colspan="14"|Players no longer at the club:

|}

Top scorers
Includes all competitive matches. The list is sorted by shirt number when total goals are equal.
Last updated on 10 May 2021

Disciplinary record
Includes all competitive matches. Players with 1 card or more included only.

Last updated on 10 May 2021

Overall
{|class="wikitable"
|-
|Games played || 38 (33 OTP Bank Liga and 5 Hungarian Cup)
|-
|Games won || 15 (11 OTP Bank Liga and 4 Hungarian Cup)
|-
|Games drawn || 10 (9 OTP Bank Liga and 1 Hungarian Cup)
|-
|Games lost || 13 (13 OTP Bank Liga and 0 Hungarian Cup)
|-
|Goals scored || 57
|-
|Goals conceded || 50
|-
|Goal difference || +7
|-
|Yellow cards || 95
|-
|Red cards || 3
|-
|rowspan="1"|Worst discipline ||  Daniel Farkaš (10 , 0 )
|-
|rowspan="1"|Best result || 8–1 (H) v Mándok - Hungarian Cup - 20-9-2020
|-
|rowspan="3"|Worst result || 0–3 (A) v Ferencváros - Nemzeti Bajnokság I - 8-11-2020
|-
| 0–3 (A) v Zalaegerszeg - Nemzeti Bajnokság I - 5-12-2020
|-
| 0–3 (A) v Újpest - Nemzeti Bajnokság I - 17-4-2021
|-
|rowspan="1"|Most appearances ||  Marin Jurina (38 appearances)
|-
|rowspan="1"|Top scorer ||  Marin Jurina (8 goals)
|-
|Points || 55/114 (48.24%)
|-

References

External links
 Official Website
 UEFA
 fixtures and results

Mezőkövesdi SE seasons
Mezőkövesd